Nassarius circumcinctus is a species of sea snail, a marine gastropod mollusc in the family Nassariidae, the Nassa mud snails or dog whelks.

Description
The shell grows to a length of 15 mm.

Distribution
This species occurs in the Mediterranean Sea.

References

 Cernohorsky W. O. (1984). Systematics of the family Nassariidae (Mollusca: Gastropoda). Bulletin of the Auckland Institute and Museum 14: 1–356.
 Oliverio M. & Tringali L. (1992). Two sibling species of Nassariinae in the Mediterranean Sea (Prosobranchia, Muricidae, Nassariinae). Bollettino Malacologico 28(5-12): 157-160 
 Gofas, S.; Le Renard, J.; Bouchet, P. (2001). Mollusca, in: Costello, M.J. et al. (Ed.) (2001). European register of marine species: a check-list of the marine species in Europe and a bibliography of guides to their identification. Collection Patrimoines Naturels, 50: pp. 180–213

External links
 

Nassariidae
Gastropods described in 1852